Heroes (previously Miniature Heroes by George Smith, and known as Favourites in Australia and New Zealand) is a brand of boxed/tinned confectionery currently manufactured by Cadbury. Introduced in September 1999, they were a response to rival Mars' Celebrations and contain miniature versions of various Cadbury chocolate bars. Heroes are most popular around holidays, such as Christmas, Halloween and Easter.

Contents

United Kingdom, the Isle of Man and Ireland 
 Fudge
 Dairy Milk Caramel
 Dairy Milk
 Wispa (Added in 2015)
 Twirl
 Creme Egg Twisted (Added in 2009)
 Eclair (Added in 2008)
 Double Decker (Known as "Dinky Decker", added in 2019)
 Crunchie (Originally as Crunchie Bite. Never Removed)

Previous selections included 
 Bournville (Added in 2008, removed in 2013)
 Dairy Milk Whole Nut (Dairy Milk with added hazelnut in the centre. Added in 2002, removed in 2008)
 Dream (Removed in 2008)
 Fuse (Removed in 2004)
 Picnic (Removed in 2007)
 Time Out (Removed in 2007)
 Toblerone (Added for Christmas 2013, 2014 and 2015)
 Nuts About Caramel (Cadbury's Caramel with added hazelnut in the centre. Removed in Mid-2000's)

Australia and New Zealand 
 Boost
 Crunchie
 Dairy Milk
 Dairy Milk Caramello
 Flake
 Cherry Ripe
 Dream
 Freddo Frog
 Fry's Turkish Delight
 Moro
 Old Gold
 Picnic
 Time Out
 Twirl
 Mint Bubbly
 Marvellous Creations Jelly Popping Candy Beans

References

External links 
 Cadbury Heroes  Cadbury.co.uk
 Cadbury Australia – Favourites

Chocolate bars
Cadbury brands
Products introduced in 1999